Tri posleratna druga (trans. Three Post-war Friends) is the sixth studio album released by Serbian and former Yugoslav singer-songwriter Đorđe Balašević.

Tri posleratna druga is the first of Balašević's studio album that featured guitarist Elvis Stanić and drummer Tonči Grabušić from Rijeka. The album is perhaps most memorable for the humorous rap-oriented song "Sugar Rap", the song "Još jedna pesma o maloj garavoj", the folk rock songs "Devojka sa čardaš nogama" and "Ćaletova pesma" and the ballads "D-moll", "Kad odem" and "Saputnik".

On album release day, JRT aired music videos for this album. Videos were filmed in Serbian national theatere (tracks number 2 and 5), by Danube in Novi Sad…

Track listing
All the songs were written by Đorđe Balašević.
"Sugar Rap" – 4:13
"Još jedna pesma o maloj garavoj" (Another Song About A Dark-Haired Little Girl) – 3:16
"Devojka sa čardaš nogama" (A Girl With Csárdás Legs) – 3:25
"Ćaletova pesma" (My Dad's Song) – 4:50
"D-moll" (D Minor) – 4:12
"Kad odem" (When I'm Gone) – 5:55
"Saputnik" (Fellow Traveler) – 4:50
"Remorker" (Tugboat) – 3:50
"O, Bože" (Oh, God) – 4:21

Personnel
Đorđe Balašević – vocals
Aleksandar Dujin – piano, keyboard
Aleksandar Kravić – bass guitar
Elvis Stanić – guitar
Ignac Šen – violin
Tonči Grabušić – drums
Siniša Horvat – sound engineer
Đorđe Petrović – producer

Samples
Još jedna pesma o maloj garavoj - Lutka sa naslovne strane by Zabranjeno pušenje, Mirka by Đorđe Balašević and Istok-zapad (telepatski) by Leb i sol.
Remorker - Poluuspavanka by Đorđe Balašević.

References

External links
Tri Posleratna Druga at Discogs

1989 albums
Đorđe Balašević albums
Jugoton albums